XHARE-FM is a radio station on 97.7 FM in Ojinaga, Chihuahua. The station is owned by the succession of Alfredo Rohana Estrada and carries the Ke Buena national grupera format from Radiópolis.

History
XHARE began on AM as XEARE-AM 1450, receiving its concession on June 12, 1981. It migrated to FM in 2011.

At one point in the mid-2010s, XHARE was just one of two remaining FM Globo stations in Mexico, along with MVS-owned XHPF-FM Mexicali. MVS began to use the format on more stations in 2018.

On August 3, 2020, XHARE-FM flipped from FM Globo to Ke Buena.

References

Radio stations in Chihuahua